Bombshell is a British television military drama series, produced by Shed Productions, the company behind Bad Girls, Footballers' Wives, and Waterloo Road. The series, originally commissioned by Shed Productions in early 2004, focuses on the day-to-day workload of officers and soldiers in the British Army, and was subsequently given the nickname Army Wives by the British press. The series was first teased by the creators in March 2002, and was described as "a focus on how the army is changing with the recruitment of more women and a more lenient attitude to homosexuality." The series was initially offered to the BBC, but the producers were unhappy with the rights deal initially offered by the channel.

The series attracted a strong initial casting, with Zöe Lucker, Bertie Carvel and Rosie Marcel among the first cast members confirmed to star in the series. After filming completed, ITV announced that the series was scheduled to be aired in February 2005. After the series failed to materialise, there was suggestion that the series could launch on ITV2 instead, but this did not happen, and the series has never been officially broadcast in the UK.

An ITV spokesperson claimed that the reason the series was shelved was due to the "undeniable similarities" between the series and Ultimate Force, which at the time, was struggling in the ratings, with two series having been cancelled mid-run due to poor ratings. However, just over a year later, the series was shown on TV One in New Zealand in 2006, and on the Hallmark Channel in Australia in 2008. A DVD of the series was also released on 3 March 2007 in New Zealand.

A spin-off series, entitled Bombshell Bootcamp, which followed the cast as they trained at an Army Boot Camp in Bracknell in preparation for their roles in the series, was also due to air on ITV2.

Cast
 Zöe Lucker — Captain Jenna Marston
 Andrew McKay — Gunner Luke Bates
 Robert Beck — Bombardier Boyd Billington
 Emma Rydal — Cheryl Cotter 
 Rosie Marcel — Gunner Stacey Dawes
 Lucy Cohu — Valerie Welling
 Bertie Carvel — Lieutenant Roddy Frost
 Felix Scott — Gunner Adam Hodges 
 Jeremy Sheffield — Major Nicholas Welling
 Michael Obiora — Gunner Jackson Clark
 Daisy Dunlop — Gunner Karina Fuller
 Chris Geere — Gunner Dean McGowan
 Alicya Eyo — Gunner Gaynor Harvey
 Simon Sherlock — Lance Bombardier Terry Cotter
 Bob Cryer — Guy Corderey
 Alix Wilton Regan — Sophie Welling

Episode list

References

External links
 

TVNZ 1 original programming
2006 British television series debuts
2006 British television series endings
2000s British drama television series
ITV television dramas
British crime drama television series
2000s British television miniseries
Television series by Warner Bros. Television Studios
English-language television shows
Television shows set in Berkshire